Tecuceanu is a Romanian surname. Notable people with the surname include: 

Catalin Tecuceanu (born 1999), Romanian-born Italian athlete
Toni Tecuceanu (1972–2010), Romanian comedy actor
 (1929–1997), Romanian writer

Romanian-language surnames